Bakırköy railway station is the main railway station in Bakırköy, Istanbul. The station was closed in March 2013 and subsequently demolished to make way for a larger, more modern station as part of the Marmaray project. The rebuilt station was opened on 12 March 2019.

The new Bakırköy station has two platforms serving four tracks.

Gallery

References

Bakırköy
Railway stations in Istanbul Province
Railway stations opened in 1872
1872 establishments in the Ottoman Empire
High-speed railway stations in Turkey